Magnolia Antonino ( Welborn; December 14, 1915 – July 22, 2010) was a Senator of the Philippines. The daughter of George Welborn and Hipolita Rodriguez, she was married to Gaudencio Antonino, also a Senator. She was born in Balaoan, La Union.

Early life
Senator Magnolia Antonino was born in Balaoan, La Union, on December 14, 1915 to George Welborn and Hipolita Rodriguez.

Personal life
She was married to the Senator Gaudencio Antonino of Jaen, Nueva Ecija. The couple had four children, including Nueva Ecija Congressman Rodolfo "Rody" Antonino.

Education

She graduated from the Balaoan public schools and La Union High school and completed combined normal courses from the Philippine Normal School in 1934. She started as a home economics teacher in La Union then became principal at the Balaoan Elementary School.

Political career

She was elected in the House of Representatives as an independent candidate for the first district of La Union in 1965. She ran and won as senator in lieu of her husband who died on the eve of the 1967 senatorial election.

During her term as senator from 1968 to 1972, Antonino worked for the passage of laws including Republic Act 6124 (Providing for the Fixing of the Maximum Selling Prices of Essential Articles or Commodities and Creating the Price Control Council); RA 6235 (Prohibiting Explosives and Flammables, Corrosive or Poisonous Substances or Material in Passenger Aircraft and Regulating the Loading thereof in Cargo Aircraft); and RA 6395 which consolidated and revised the Charter of the National Power Corporation.

She also helped enact laws that benefited women and children, farmers through increased production of rice and corn, and people from the government and education sectors.

She was treasurer of the Antonino Construction Enterprises (1946–1953); secretary-treasurer, then manager, Western Mindanao Lumber Co.; general manager, G. E. Antonio, Inc., treasurer, Polytechnic Colleges of the Philippines; director, Philippine Commercial and Industrial Bank and Luzon Cement Corporation.

She was an officer and member of various social and civic organizations, including Inner Wheel Club of Manila, WYCA, Manila Girl Scouts Council, Philippine Band of Mercy, Philippine Garden Club. Antonino is also grandmother to former Representative Darlene Antonino-Custodio of the 1st district of South Cotabato.

Death
Antonino died July 22, 2010 at the age of 94.

References

External links
Senate of the Philippines - Manolia Antonio

1915 births
2010 deaths
People from La Union
Ilocano people
Senators of the 6th Congress of the Philippines
Senators of the 7th Congress of the Philippines
Members of the House of Representatives of the Philippines from La Union
Women members of the House of Representatives of the Philippines
Women members of the Senate of the Philippines
Philippine Normal University alumni
Filipino schoolteachers
20th-century Filipino women politicians
20th-century Filipino politicians
20th-century Filipino educators